Arif Şentürk (1941 – 15 February 2022) was a Yugoslav-born Turkish traditional folk singer and compiler. He was known for performing Balkan ethnical music.

Life and career 
Şentürk's father was of Albanian origin while his mother of Bosniak origin. He was born in Kumanovo, Yugoslavia. He immigrated with his family to Turkey in 1956 after graduating Turkish primary school in PR Macedonia, FPR Yugoslavia. First, his family settled in Kırklareli after that they moved to Zeytinburnu district of Istanbul. Once he worked as a barber in Zeytinburnu. He attended Bakırköy and Yeşilköy Music Community Home. Arif Şentürk took the examination of the TRT Amateur Singers and won it. He was endorsed by Nida Tüfekçi.

Arif, who was known for compiling a lot of traditional Rumelian Turkish, Macedonian, Albanian and Gypsy folk songs, produced twelve albums. The most famous songs of his are Deryalar, Ramize, Safiye, Debreli Hasan, Ani Mor Hatixhe, Oj Kosovo; and Bitola Moj Roden Kraj composed by Ajri Demirovski.

He died on 15 February 2022, at the age of 81.

Discography 
Meliha, 23 December 2008
Kına Havası, 24 December 1998
Nazikem, 4 June 1990
Deryalar, 9 January 1987
Hamdi, 9 January 1987
Yemen, 9 January 1987

References

External links
 

1941 births
2022 deaths
People from Kumanovo
20th-century Turkish male singers
21st-century Turkish male singers
Turkish people of Albanian descent
Turkish people of Bosniak descent
Turkish people of Macedonian descent